Christine is a 1917 novel written by Elizabeth von Arnim using the pen-name Alice Cholmondeley. It is the only novel von Arnim wrote under that name. It is written in the style of a compilation of letters from Christine, an English girl studying in Germany, to her mother in Britain. It covers the period of May–August 1914. In the letters Christine is a witness to the mood in Germany leading up World War I. The book was initially marketed as non-fiction.

Two of von Arnim's daughters, Beatrix and Felicitas, were living in Germany during World War I. Felicitas died in Bremen in 1916, aged 16. She died of pneumonia, as does the character Christine in the novel.

Christine as propaganda
Since the beginning of World War I, propaganda has played an important role in exploiting the opposition. The credibility of propaganda can be determined by analyzing the source and comparing it with documents that are factual. In particular, British propaganda in World War I used Christine, a series of letters written by Elizabeth von Arnim, pen name Alice Cholmondeley, to promote Anti-German sentiment propaganda. When comparing the Christine letters to authentic war time letters, they were found to be fabricated.

Christine, while playing on the existing prejudices against the Germans, was also a small part of a larger British plan to induce the United States into entering the Great War. Other sections of this British plan included the Bryce Commission (also known as the Committee on Alleged German Outrages), the propaganda surrounding Edith Cavell and Gilbert Parker, and the Zimmermann Telegram.

During World War I, the British government sought assistance from the United States who had been skeptical about entering European wars up to that point. Christine was published in 1917, the same year the British convinced the United States to enter the war.
	
The novel utilized the rhetorical framework laid out by Aristotle that focused on pathos, ethos, and logos as a means to persuade the audience. Von Arnim mostly appeals to Pathos in the letters, which focuses on and plays on the emotions of the audience. The novel's foreword begins with a sentimental summary of the supposed origin of the letters:

My daughter Christine, who wrote me these letters, died at a hospital in Stuttgart on the morning of August 8th, 1914, of acute double pneumonia. I have kept the letters private for nearly three years, because, apart from the love in them that made them sacred things in days when we each still hoarded what we had of good, they seemed to me, who did not know the Germans and thought of them, as most people in England for a long while thought, without any bitterness and with a great inclination to explain away and excuse, too extreme and sweeping in their judgments. -- Alice Cholmondeley, Christine

Even the foreword to the novel creates an emotional impact on the reader and an attachment to the main character, whom they have not yet met. Most of the novel consists of similar quotations that play on the maternal instincts of mothers and the hopes and expectations of young families during the war time era. The character Christine’s eyewitness accounts of the German people is an example of logos, which lends a sense of validity to the narration. Both the portrayal of the heroine as young, innocent, studious, and independent as well as the descriptive and observant writing style give an example of the use of ethos by von Arnim.
	
The letters also follow the rhetorical framework of Ronald Reid, particularly the use of ethnocentrism, which is the creation of an “us” by way of constructing a definitive “them.” Christine's depiction of the German people, which parallels the prejudices previously mentioned, creates a definitive “us” by separating her from the Germans’ reactions to the outbreak of the war and defining herself as a foreigner. Her depiction of the German people creates juxtaposition with her quiet and mature nature from her British upbringing and portrays them as a wholly barbaric people.
	
After publication, the letters were widely accepted as true by the British and U.S. audiences. Despite the fact that it was widely known to be fiction, it was reviewed by many sources as being a truthful depiction of the German people. The portrayals in the novel mirrored the pre-existing prejudices held by the British and U.S. citizens against the Germans. A lot of British propaganda portrayed them as being barbarians and heathens, which was largely contributed to by the violence against Belgium during the Shlieffen Plan. These stereotypes made it easier for the public to consider the novel to be more fact than fiction. One article from the New York Times describes the letters as "a book that is true in essentials though it wears the garb of fiction, so real is it that one is tempted to doubt whether it is fiction at all".

Depiction of Germans
The character of Christine was introduced to the British and American public as an eyewitness to the events that explain the German mindset leading into the war. Christine describes how the German men, women, children, and babies all conform to the aims of the nation leading into World War I. She discusses the intensity of the German people as they begin to develop bloodlust at the prospect of gaining wealth through warfare with France and Russia: "[The] Germans have gone mad… [The streets] seem full of drunken people, shouting up and down with red faces all swollen with excitement." Christine also complains of the mindless marching and the callousness of the Germans as she describes them as slaves, "abject, greedy, and pitiful". An article in Nation stated if this book was accurate in its descriptions, then it would "wipe out distinction between attitude of German people and the German government", leaving little doubt in the minds of the American people that the German people and their government had different views. The review received proper appreciation once the definite authorship was confirmed by the publishers. The Christine piece was believed by many, because it offered an explanation and appeared to be written by a woman without an agenda. The book also helped the American effort to rally the American people and gain support for the war. Christine provided the audience with new details to add to the stereotype of the German people.

Identity of the author
Arnim went to great lengths to keep the public from knowing her true identity. "The adopted pseudonym, her subsequent fierce repudiation of authorship, even among intimate friends, may well be due to her realization that any suspected connection with herself might result in the most unhappy consequences…."

Leslie De Charms addresses the success of Christine in her biography commenting that "Christine would not only be widely read at home, but would be heard of across the Channel and praised or abused according to the political sympathies of readers".

Many book reviewers questioned if the author was a young English woman traveling to Germany for violin lessons, The Dial of Chicago stated, "the doubt as to the legitimacy of the letter comes when one reads the initial one…. the fluency of the style, seem to indicate that 'Christine' is a clever, but fabricated narrative". Another review from The New Republic, published "were 'Christine' genuine, it would be impressive". The style of writing in the first letter forces the reader to question the intended audience. Throughout the first letter 'Christine' sets up the scene explaining her background; something one would not expect an individual to do when writing home to her mother for the first time; especially if she is writing in a hurry before she unpacks.

Also, while Arnim might have gone to great lengths to keep her identity secret, some suspected her as the one writing the letters, "in style and feeling 'Christine' reminds one strongly of 'Fraulein Schmidt and Mr. Anstruther' and other works of the Baroness von Arnim". (Athenaeum London, Book Review Digest 1917).

Another aspect that made Christine unbelievable was the level of awareness for individuals in each German social class. "The letters thus show four different classes of people--the middle-class inhabitants of the boarding house; the well-to-do country folk, the artistic set, and the aristocratic Junker set; each one of these different sets, its opinions and manners and point of view, we see through the medium of these letters". This was an unlikely perspective to be found in letters written for her mother by a girl who grew up poor. Another review of Christine by the Boston Transcript remarked that "it is not often that a collection of letters intended for no eyes but those of a beloved mother turns out to an amazingly accurate revelation of the real, hidden nature of a great people," (Boston Transcript Book Review Digest 1917).

References

Literature
 "A luminous story: absorbingly interesting" [Review of the book Christine]. New York Times, Aug. 12, 1917. Retrieved from ProQuest Historical Newspapers The New York Times (1851–2005).
 "A new novel by a new author" [Review of the book Christine]. New York Times, July 29, 1917. Retrieved from ProQuest Historical Newspapers The New York Times (1851–2005).
 "Arnim, Mary Annette [May] von. (n.d.)." Retrieved October 27, 2008 Oxford Dictionary of National Biography
 Bitzer, Lloyd F. "Political Rhetoric." Handbook of Political Communication. Eds. Dan D. Nimmo and Keith R. Sanders. Beverly Hills, CA: Sage Publications, 1981. 225-248.
 Book Review Digest. H.W. Wilson Company: New York City, 1917, 13, 101-102.
 Cholmondeley, Alice. Christine. New York: The Macmillan Company, 1917. 1-250.
 Doob, L. (1950). "Goebbels' Principles of Nazi Propaganda" The Public Opinion Quarterly 3, 14(3), 419-442. Retrieved October 22, 2008
 Elizabeth von Arnim - Biography and Works. (n.d.). Retrieved October 27, 2008
 "Fact and fiction" [Review of the book Christine]. New York Times, Sep. 23, 1917. Retrieved from ProQuest Historical Newspapers The New York Times (1851–2005)
 Hillesum, Etty. An Interrupted Life: Letters From Westerbork. Comp. Jan G. Gaarlandt. Trans. Arnold J. Pomerans. New York: Pantheon Books, 1986. 1-156.
 Jackson, M., & Reely, M. (1918). Cholmondeley, Alice. In Book Review Digest (13 ed., pp. 101–102). New York: H.W. Wilson Company.
 Matthew, H.C.G., Harrison, Brian. Oxford Dictionary of National Biography. New York: Oxford University Press, 2004. 471-473.
 Phillips, T. (2000). "The rules of war: Gothic transgressions in first world war fiction" Gothic Studies, 2(2), 232-244. Retrieved October 22, 2008
 Read "Christine" by Alice Cholmondeley [Review of the book Christine]. New York Times, Sep. 15, 1917. Retrieved from ProQuest Historical Newspapers The New York Times (1851–2005)
 "Recent noteworthy fiction" [Review of the book Christine]. New York Times, Dec. 17, 1917. Retrieved from ProQuest Historical Newspapers The New York Times (1851–2005)
 Reid, Ronald F. "New England Rhetoric And The French War, 1754-1760: A Case Study In The Rhetoric Of War," Communication Monographs.
 "To-day's most eagerly discussed novel Christine by Alice Cholmondeley" [Review of the book Christine]. New York Times, Aug. 25, 1917. Retrieved from ProQuest Historical Newspapers The New York Times (1851–2005)
 Von Moltke, Helmuth J. Letters to Freya. Trans. Beate R. Von Oppen. Ed. Beate R. Von Oppen. New York: Alfred a. Knopf, 1990. 1-441.

External links
 

Political forgery
1917 books
Anti-German sentiment
Propaganda books and pamphlets
Novels by Elizabeth von Arnim